Ronan McLaughlin (born 11 March 1987) is an Irish cyclist, who currently rides for amateur team Dan Morrissey–MIG.ie–Pactimo. He also rode for UCI Continental team  from 2008 until 2013, and competed in the road race at the 2012 UCI Road World Championships.

Major results

2005
 2nd Road race, National Junior Road Championships
2008
 3rd Time trial, National Under-23 Road Championships
2009
 2nd Road race, National Under-23 Road Championships
2010
 4th Overall Mi-Août en Bretagne
 8th Circuit de Wallonie
2013
 5th Road race, National Road Championships
 8th Kattekoers
 8th Beverbeek Classic
2015
 2nd Overall Tour of the North
2017
 3rd Overall Rás Mumhan
2018
 1st Shay Elliott Memorial Race
 1st Stage 2 Tour of Ulster
2019
 1st Shay Elliott Memorial Race
2021
 Everesting World Record 6 hrs 40 minutes

References

1987 births
Living people
Irish male cyclists